Glasgow or Glasgo is a surname. Notable people with the name include: 

 Earl of Glasgow, hereditary title in the Peerage of Scotland
 Alex Glasgow, Singer and scriptwriter
 William Glass, born William Glasgow - Founder of the Remotest Community in the World
 Bob Glasgow, American politician
 Cameron Glasgow (born 1966), Scottish rugby union player
 Carl Glasgow (1883–1954), Australian politician
 Chad Glasgow (born 1972), American football coach
Don Glasgo, American professor associated with the Giant Country Horns
 Ellen Glasgow, American novelist
 Gary Glasgow (born 1976), Trinidadian soccer player
 George Glasgow (1931–2013), American basketball player and soccer coach
 Harry Glasgow, Scottish football player
 Hugh Glasgow (1769–1818), American politician
 James Glasgow ( 1735-1819), American politician
 Jordan Glasgow (born 1996), American football player
Michaela Glasgo (born 1992/1993), Canadian politician
 Nesby Glasgow (1957–2020), American football player
 Robert Glasgow (1925–2008), American organist 
 Ron Glasgow,  Scottish rugby union player
 Ryan Glasgow (born 1993), American football player
 Scott Glasgow, American composer 
 William Glasgow (general) (1876–1955), Australian military officer
 Walter Glasgow (born 1957), American sailor
 Wayne Glasgow (1926–2000), American basketball player
 William Glasgow (1906–1972), American art director

Surnames
Surnames of British Isles origin
Scottish surnames